Obe Blanc (born May 17, 1985) is an American amateur wrestler who competed at 57 kg in freestyle wrestling for the United States of America.

Biography

High School and College
Blanc wrestled for Lely High School in Naples, Florida during his high school career. He was a Florida high school state champion and was ranked 6th in the nation by Amateur Wrestling News during his senior season. After high school, Blanc attended Lock Haven University, where he placed sixth at 125 pounds at the 2007 NCAA Wrestling National Championships, earning him All-American honors. He finished his collegiate career at Oklahoma State, where he was one win shy of All-American honors at the 2009 NCAA Wrestling National Championships.

International
Internationally, Blanc finished first at the United States World Team Trials in 2010, and finished in 9th place at the 2010 World Wrestling Championships. Other notable finishes in tournaments include a silver medal in the 2011 Pan American Games, University Nationals silver medal, and 2013 United States World Team Trials champion.

Major results

References 

1985 births
Living people
Oklahoma State Cowboys wrestlers
Pan American Games silver medalists for the United States
Wrestlers at the 2011 Pan American Games
Pan American Games medalists in wrestling
American male sport wrestlers
Medalists at the 2011 Pan American Games
20th-century American people
21st-century American people